John A. Power is a former English professional rugby league footballer (born  in Rochdale, Greater Manchester, England).

Career ending injury
John was just 18 when he suffered a devastating spinal cord injury, while playing for Oldham RLFC 'A' team. It ended his promising career as a professional rugby player.

External links
RFL Benevolent Fund: Oarsome effort
Oldham Chronicle: Power hits his markOldham Chronicle: Power Rows to Recovery

1976 births
Living people
English rugby league players
Rugby league players from Rochdale
Rugby articles needing expert attention